Freedom is the second extended play (EP) by Canadian singer Justin Bieber. It is also the first EP released by Bieber since My World (2009). It was surprise-released on April 4, 2021, by Def Jam Recordings. The EP is a follow-up to Bieber's sixth studio album Justice, released a few weeks prior on March 19, 2021. The EP is gospel-inspired.

Background and songs
Freedom is a gospel-inspired EP that serves as Bieber's way of professing his love to God as he embarks on a soul-searching journey to better understand himself and his past through the lens of his religious beliefs. The EP begins with the Afrobeat-filled title track, a collaboration with Beam, where Bieber and Beam address temptation against laid-back tropical beats. On the following tracks, "All She Wrote" featuring Brandon Love and Chandler Moore and R&B cut "We're in This Together", Bieber shifts into rap, discussing his fame and "needing saving", with the latter alluding to the 2014 police raid of his Los Angeles home after being accused of allegedly egging a neighbor's house and ending with a prayer for those listening and their families. The fourth track, "Where You Go I Follow" featuring Moore, Pink Sweats, and Judah Smith, finds Bieber singing about the resurrection of Jesus. He is joined by Moore, Smith, and Tori Kelly on the fifth track, "Where Do I Fit In", where they sing about Jesus and his unconditional love for everyone. The final track, "Afraid to Say" featuring Lauren Walters, takes a more guitar-focused turn as Bieber explores the effects of cancel culture.

Reception

Critical response
Vulture Halle Kiefer compared Freedom to Bieber's sixth studio album, Justice, saying they both find him "ruminating on the spiritual and existential state of his existence". Emlyn Travis, writing for MTV News, felt that the EP "allows Bieber to redefine himself and restructure his future". Tomás Mier from People wrote that "Bieber is channeling his spirituality through song". Brad Wheeler of The Globe and Mail found the EP to be "mundane" and that it came off as "self-absorbed", further adding, "He's not serving somebody – he's serving himself."

Accolades

Commercial performance
Freedom debuted at number 172 on the US Billboard 200 chart. The EP earned 7,000 equivalent album units with less than five full days of availability in its first tracking week. It is Bieber's first entry on the Top Christian Albums chart, debuting at number three for the week of April 17, 2021. All six of the EP's tracks concurrently charted on the Hot Christian Songs chart, also becoming Bieber's first entries there.

Track listing

Personnel

 Boi-1da – producer (tracks 1, 2)
 Vinylz – producer (tracks 1, 2)
 Goatsmans – producer (tracks 4, 5)
 Cvre – producer (track 1)
 Sean Momberger – producer (track 2)
 Lee Major – producer (track 2)
 Wallis Lane – producer (track 3)
 Vindver – producer (track 3)
 Justin Bieber – producer (track 6)
 Don Mills – additional producer (track 1)
 DJ Alizay – additional producer (track 3)
 Angel Lopez – co-producer (track 3)
 JulesTheWulf – co-producer (track 6)

Charts

Weekly charts

Year-end charts

References

2021 EPs
Justin Bieber albums
Albums produced by Boi-1da
Albums produced by Justin Bieber
Albums produced by Lee Major
Albums produced by Vinylz
Def Jam Recordings EPs
Surprise albums